In public transport, Route 19 may refer to:

Melbourne tram route 19
Route 19 (MTA Maryland), a bus route in Baltimore, Maryland and its suburbs
London Buses route 19

19